St. Luke's School  may refer to:
St. Luke's School (Manhattan), Greenwich Village, New York, USA
St. Luke's School (Connecticut),  New Canaan, Connecticut, USA
St Luke's Church of England School,  Exeter, Devon, England
St Luke's High School,  Barrhead, Glasgow, Scotland
St Luke's Primary School (C of E), Crosby, near Liverpool, England